Sobotka or Sobótka may refer to:

Places
 Sobotka, town in the Czech Republic
 Sobótka, town in Lower Silesian Voivodeship, south-west Poland
 Gmina Sobótka, district for which the above Sobótka is the administrative seat
 Sobótka, Podlaskie Voivodeship, village in north-east Poland
 Sobótka, Opatów County, village in Świętokrzyskie Voivodeship, south-central Poland
 Sobótka, Skarżysko County, village in Świętokrzyskie Voivodeship, south-central Poland
 Sobótka, Koło County, village in Greater Poland Voivodeship, west-central Poland
 Sobótka, Ostrów Wielkopolski County, village in Greater Poland Voivodeship, west-central Poland
 Subotica, city and municipality in northern Serbia, called "Sobotka" during Ottoman rule

Journal
 Śląski Kwartalnik Historyczny Sobótka

People with the surname
 Al Sobotka (born 1953), building operations manager for Olympia Entertainment and Zamboni driver for the Detroit Red Wings
 Alois Sobotka (1904–1977), Czech athlete
 Bohuslav Sobotka, (born 1971), Czech ex-prime minister
 Chad Sobotka (born 1993), American baseball player 
 Gustav Sobottka (1886–1953), German politician
 Gustav Sobottka Jr. (1915–1940), German politician
 Jan Sobotka (born 1961), Czech politician
 Jiří Sobotka (1911–1994), Czech professional footballer
 Joel Sobotka (born 1970), college basketball coach
 Petr Sobotka, Czech weightlifter
 Přemysl Sobotka (born 1944), Czech physician and politician
 Ruth Sobotka (1925–1967), Austrian-born dancer and costume designer
 Vladimír Sobotka (born 1987), Czech professional ice hockey player
 Wolfgang Sobotka (born 1956), Austrian politician
 Zdeněk Sobotka (1917–2001), Czech athlete

Fictional characters:
 Frank, Nick, Ziggy, Joan and Louis Sobotka, fictional characters from the HBO television show The Wire

Czech-language surnames